Afshan Noor Azad-Kazi  (née Azad; born 12 February, 1988) is a  British actress, model, and media personality. She is best known for playing the role of Padma Patil in the Harry Potter film series, beginning in 2005 with Harry Potter and the Goblet of Fire.

Early life and education
Azad was born in Longsight, Manchester, England. She attended Whalley Range High School, and took AS-levels in chemistry, biology, English and business studies at Xaverian College in Rusholme. She went on to graduate with a Bachelor of Arts in Journalism and Design from the University of Salford.

Career
Azad is known for her performances as Padma Patil in five of the Harry Potter films, starting with 2005's Harry Potter and the Goblet of Fire. She acquired the role when casting agents visited her school and, after having attended several auditions, chose her for the part. Azad had stated that she had auditioned "just for the fun of it" and surprisingly got the part.

In 2017, Azad guest presented an episode of the CBBC series Marrying Mum & Dad with Ed Petrie whilst Naomi Wilkinson was away.

Personal life
Azad married Nabil Kazi on 19 August 2018. They are based in Worcester. On 11 April 2021, the couple announced they were expecting their first child. On 27 July 2021, Azad revealed in an Instagram post that she has given birth to her first child, a baby girl.

Assault court case
When she was 22, Azad's father and brother attacked her because of her relationship with a Hindu boy.

On 29 June 2010 Azad's father, Abdul Azad, and brother, Ashraf Azad, appeared in Manchester Magistrates' Court, charged with threatening to kill her. They were released on bail. Azad's brother was charged with "assault occasioning actual bodily harm", whilst Azad stayed with friends in London. On 20 December 2010, Azad did not attend court when the prosecution accepted her brother's guilty plea to assault occasioning actual bodily harm and a judge ruled both men were not guilty of threatening to kill Azad. On 21 January 2011 Azad's brother was imprisoned for six months.

Filmography
Film

Video games

Music videos

See also
 British Bangladeshi
 List of British Bangladeshis
 List of Harry Potter cast members

References

External links
 

Living people
1988 births
21st-century English actresses
Actresses from Manchester
Alumni of the University of Salford
British Internet celebrities
English actresses of South Asian descent
English child actresses
English female models
English film actresses
English Muslims
English people of Bangladeshi descent
People from Longsight